Brooks Nunatak is an isolated nunatak,  high, standing  southwest of Shurley Ridge on the south side of Mackin Table in the Patuxent Range, Pensacola Mountains. It was mapped by the United States Geological Survey from surveys and from U.S. Navy air photos, 1956–66, and named by the Advisory Committee on Antarctic Names for Robert E. Brooks, a biologist at South Pole Station, summer 1966–67.

References 

Nunataks of Queen Elizabeth Land